Saitovsky (Säyet) is a rural locality (a village) in Denisovsky Selsoviet, Meleuzovsky District, Bashkortostan, Russia. The population was 377 as of 2010. There are 7 streets.

Geography 
Saitovsky is located 25 km northwest of Meleuz (the district's administrative centre) by road. Saitovo is the nearest rural locality.

References 

Rural localities in Meleuzovsky District